Cuchu Ingenio is a small town in Bolivia. In 2001 it had an estimated population of 406.

References

Populated places in Potosí Department